Lucy Wilson may refer to

 Lucy Sarah Atkins Wilson (1801–1863), a British author and editor, specialising in children's scientific literature. 

 Lucy Langdon Wilson (1864–1937), an American educator and ethnographer.

 Lucy Wilson (suffragist) (1834-1891), a Yorkshire born suffragist, educationalist and campaigner for the rights of women.

Lucy Wilson (1888–1980), an American physicist.